Cosmopterix luteoapicalis is a moth in the family Cosmopterigidae. It was described by Sinev in 2002. It is found in the Democratic Republic of the Congo and Senegal.

The larvae feed on Cyperus rotundus.

References

Moths described in 2002
luteoapicalis